Ashiestiel is a village in the Scottish Borders area of Scotland, in the Parish of Caddonfoot, on the south side of the River Tweed, 4m (6.5 km) east of Innerleithen.

The original name of this village in the Royal Ettrick Forest was "Echesteile" in 1456. Ashiestiel House was the home of Sir Walter Scott from 1804 until he moved to Abbotsford House in 1812.

Ashiestiel Hill rises to 402 m (1319 ft).

See also
List of places in the Scottish Borders
List of places in East Lothian

References

External links

RCAHMS/Canmore record of Ashiestiel Bridge
Geograph photo, Ashiestiel Bridge
Geograph photo of Peel House, Ashiestiel
Geograph photo of Ashiestiel Hill

Villages in the Scottish Borders